The 2022 WFG Masters was held from December 6 to 11 at the Sixteen Mile Sports Complex in Oakville, Ontario. It was the third Grand Slam event and second major of the 2022–23 curling season.

Qualification
The top 16 ranked men's and women's teams on the World Curling Federation's world team rankings as of November 7, 2022 qualified for the event. In the event that a team declines their invitation, the next-ranked team on the world team ranking is invited until the field is complete.

Men
Top world team ranking men's teams:
 Brad Gushue
 Niklas Edin
 Brendan Bottcher
 Bruce Mouat
 Matt Dunstone
 Kevin Koe
 Joël Retornaz
 Reid Carruthers
 Yannick Schwaller
 Ross Whyte
 Colton Flasch
 Korey Dropkin
 Steffen Walstad
 Magnus Ramsfjell
 Michael Brunner
 Marco Hösli
 John Epping

Women
Top world team ranking women's teams:
 Kerri Einarson
 Anna Hasselborg
 Silvana Tirinzoni
 Satsuki Fujisawa
 Kaitlyn Lawes
 Tracy Fleury
 Gim Eun-ji
 Jennifer Jones
 Kim Eun-jung
 Isabella Wranå
 Casey Scheidegger
 Raphaela Keiser
 Clancy Grandy
 Chelsea Carey
 Michèle Jäggi
 Tabitha Peterson

Men

Teams
The teams are listed as follows:

Round-robin standings
Final round-robin standings

Round-robin results 
All draw times are listed in Eastern Time (UTC−04:00).

Draw 2
Tuesday, December 6, 11:30 am

Draw 4
Tuesday, December 6, 6:30 pm

Draw 5
Wednesday, December 7, 8:00 am

Draw 7
Wednesday, December 7, 3:30 pm

Draw 9
Thursday, December 8, 8:00 am

Draw 11
Thursday, December 8, 3:30 pm

Draw 14
Friday, December 9, 11:30 am

Draw 16
Friday, December 9, 7:30 pm

Tiebreaker
Saturday, December 10, 8:00 am

Playoffs

Quarterfinals
Saturday, December 10, 11:30 am

Semifinals
Saturday, December 10, 7:30 pm

Final
Sunday, December 11, 5:00 pm

Women

Teams
The teams are listed as follows:

Round-robin standings
Final round-robin standings

Round-robin results 
All draw times are listed in Eastern Time (UTC−04:00).

Draw 1
Tuesday, December 6, 8:00 am

Draw 3
Tuesday, December 6, 3:00 pm

Draw 6
Wednesday, December 7, 11:30 am

Draw 8
Wednesday, December 7, 7:30 pm

Draw 10
Thursday, December 8, 11:30 am

Draw 12
Thursday, December 8, 7:30 pm

Draw 13
Friday, December 9, 8:00 am

Draw 15
Friday, December 9, 3:30 pm

Tiebreakers
Saturday, December 10, 8:00 am

Playoffs

Quarterfinals
Saturday, December 10, 3:30 pm

Semifinals
Saturday, December 10, 7:30 pm

Final
Sunday, December 11, 1:00 pm

Notes

References

External links

December 2022 sports events in Canada
2022 in Canadian curling
Curling in Ontario
2022 in Ontario
2022
Oakville, Ontario